Jorge Pereira da Silva (born 4 December 1985) or better known as Jorginho is a Brazilian football player who currently plays as a striker for Birkirkara in the Maltese Premier League. He previously played for Kecskeméti TE located in Hungary; a club that competes in the well-known Nemzeti Bajnokság I. He is the brother of prolific Brazilian striker Ueslei.

Career
Jorginho was born in Bahia where he started his career at the age of 13 playing at the youth level for Bahia (Div 1 Brazilian team) from 1998 to 2003.

In 2004, Jorginho was transferred to the Japanese market to play at the biggest league of the country the J1 League. In Japan, he built a spectacular career joining big teams such as Nagoya Grampus Eight and Sanfrecce Hiroshima both Japanese Div 1 teams. Jorginho also played for Tokushima Vortis and FC GIFU during his stay in Japan.

In 2008 Jorginho comes back to his original country to play the Brazilian Div 1 State Championships for teams such as Mixto Esporte Clube, EC Bahia and EC Aguia Negra where he’d keep his performance of 0.5 goals per game. In 2009, Jorginho goes abroad once more to confirm his football. He joined  Al-Mabarrah,  Lebanese Premier League team that disputes important competitions such as FA Cup and Arab Champions League.

Jorginho’s also played for Qormi FC Premier League team that competes in the Maltese Premier League.

In 2012, he signed to Kecskeméti TE.

For the 2014–15 season, he joined Hibernians, and proved to be one of the most lethal strikers in the Maltese Premier League. He led Hibernians to the league title and jointly topped the scoring charts with teammate and strike partner Edison Luiz dos Santos. This helped qualify them for the second qualifying round of the 2015–16 UEFA Champions League

Jorginho joined Gzira United F.C. in 2018. He scored on his debut against UE Sant Julià in the UEFA Europa League. On 8 January 2019, he signed with Birkirkara FC.

Club statistics

References

External links

 Gifu

1985 births
Living people
Maltese Premier League players
Footballers from São Paulo (state)
Brazilian footballers
Association football forwards
Nagoya Grampus players
Sanfrecce Hiroshima players
Tokushima Vortis players
FC Gifu players
Esporte Clube Bahia players
Mixto Esporte Clube players
Al Mabarra Club players
Qormi F.C. players
Kecskeméti TE players
Hibernians F.C. players
Khaleej FC players
Gżira United F.C. players
J1 League players
Birkirkara F.C. players
Saudi First Division League players
Japan Football League players
Brazilian expatriate footballers
Expatriate footballers in Japan
Expatriate footballers in Lebanon
Expatriate footballers in Malta
Expatriate footballers in Hungary
Brazilian expatriate sportspeople in Japan
Brazilian expatriate sportspeople in Lebanon
Brazilian expatriate sportspeople in Malta
Brazilian expatriate sportspeople in Hungary
Expatriate footballers in Saudi Arabia
Brazilian expatriate sportspeople in Saudi Arabia
Lebanese Premier League players